The Powder Blues Band is a Canadian blues/pop/jazz band formed in 1978 in Vancouver. Its first album Uncut went double platinum in Canada. The second album Thirsty Ears was similarly popular.

Their best known songs include: "Boppin' with the Blues", "Doin' It Right", "Thirsty Ears", "Hear That Guitar Ring", and "What've I Been Drinkin".

History
The Powder Blues was founded in 1978 as a house band in Vancouver, British Columbia. The band was founded by brothers Tom Lavin (guitar, vocals), Jack Lavin (bass, vocals), and Willie MacCalder (keyboards, vocals). After playing in local clubs for 18 months, the band released their self-financed and self-produced debut album, Uncut, in 1980, followed by a tour of Canada and the US. The band won the Juno Award for "Most Promising Group of the Year" in 1981. Uncut went double platinum in Canada in 1982, selling over 200,000 copies. Their second album, Thirsty Ears, was released in 1981 and was certified platinum in Canada. In 1986, the band won the American W.C. Handy Award for "Foreign Band of the Year". The band's greatest hits album First Decade was released in 1990 and was certified gold.

The band is now known as Tom Lavin and the Legendary Powder Blues. They were still touring as of winter 2020.

The initial lineup of the band consisted of:
 Tom Lavin – guitar, vocal
 Jack Lavin – bass
 Duris Maxwell – drums
 Wayne Kozak – saxophone
 Gordon Bertram – saxophone
 David Woodward  – saxophone
 Will MacCalder – keyboards, vocals

Discography

Singles
 "Doin' It Right" – 1980  #40 Can
 "Boppin' with the Blues" – 1980 #88 Can
 "What've I Been Drinkin" – 1980 #28 CanAC
 "Hear That Guitar Ring" – 1981 #22 Can-CanCon #22 Can-AOCanCon
 "Lovin' Kissin' & Huggin'" – 1981 #47 Can
 "Thirsty Ears" – 1981  #17 Can
 "Farmer John" – 1983
 "I'm on the Road Again" – 1985

Albums
 1979 Uncut (Blue Wave)
 1980 Uncut [re-issue] (RCA)
 1981 Thirsty Ears (Liberty/Capitol-EMI)
 1982 Party Line (Liberty/Capitol-EMI) #36 Can.
 1983 Powder Blues (Liberty/Capitol-EMI)
 1983 Red Hot/True Blue (RCA)  #88 Can (4 weeks)
 1984 Live At Montreux (Blue Wave)
 1990 First Decade/Greatest Hits (WEA)
 1993 Let's Get Loose (WEA)
 1997 Live At Montreux [CD re-issue] (Peerless)
 1997 Lowell Fulson with the Powder Blues Band (Stony Plain)
 2002 Swingin' the Blues (Blue Wave)
 2004 Blues + Jazz = BLAZZ! (Blue Wave)

Awards
 1981 – Juno Award for "Most Promising Group of the Year"
 1986 – W. C. Handy Award for Blues, Best Foreign Band

References

External links
Tom Lavin & the Legendary Powder Blues Band official site
CanConRox bio
Tom Lavin & the Legendary Powder Blues Fan Page
 
Entry for Powder Blues at 45cat.com
Entry for The Powder Blues at 45cat.com
 

Canadian blues musical groups
Juno Award for Breakthrough Group of the Year winners
Musical groups established in 1978
Musical groups from Vancouver
1978 establishments in British Columbia